Ténenkou Cercle is an administrative subdivision of the Mopti Region of Mali.  Its seat is the town of Ténenkou, which is also its largest town.  The cercle is divided into communes. 

Ténenkou Cercle contains the following ten communes:
 Diafarabé
 Diaka
 Diondiori
 Karéri
 Ouro Ardo
 Ouro Guiré
 Sougoulbé
 Ténenkou
 Togoro Kotia
 Toguéré Coumbé

References

Cercles of Mali